Aluf (ret.) Herzl Bodinger (born 1943) is a retired general in the Israel Defense Forces and a former Commander in Chief of the Israeli Air Force. Today, Bodinger is member of the International Board of Governors of Ariel University.

Military career
Bodinger was born in Israel and joined the IDF in 1961. He volunteered to attend the flight academy and graduated as a fighter pilot, flying the Dassault Mystère and Sud Aviation Vautour. During the Six-Day War, Bodinger served as a Vautour pilot and participated in Operation Moked, attacking airfields in Iraq and Egypt and destroying 10 Tupolev Tu-16 bombers on the ground. During the Yom Kippur War, he was a Mirage III pilot, and shot down a Syrian MiG-17. During post-war conflicts, he shot down a Syrian MiG-21 over Lebanon.

Bodinger went on to command the Israeli Air Force from January 1992 to July 1996. During his 35-year career, Bodinger accumulated about 6,000 flight hour and conducted 451 aerial sorties.

Civilian career
Following his retirement from the air force, Bodinger was appointed to head the company RADA Electronic Industries. In the 2000s, Bodinger headed a committee appointed by Transportation Minister Shaul Mofaz to prepare a master plan for Israel's airports.

References

Israeli aviators
Israeli Air Force generals
1943 births
Living people
Ariel University
Flight instructors
Israeli Jews
Israeli people of Romanian-Jewish descent
Israeli chief executives
Six-Day War pilots
Yom Kippur War pilots
Bar-Ilan University alumni